Wennovation Hub is pioneer innovation accelerator located in Nigeria, with offices in Abuja, Kaduna, Lagos and Ibadan. As one of the very early innovation hubs in Nigeria, having been founded in August 2010 and opening its doors in February 2011, it has enjoyed early success  and counts several award winning start-ups including Hutbay, OTGPlaya, Fuelmetrics and Nerve Mobile as its successful graduates. It focuses on social impact sectors including Education, Agriculture, Healthcare and Infrastructure and emphasizes the importance of job creation in its programs. Considered one of the pioneers of what is now called the Yabacon Valley ecosystem, Wennovation albeit retains a model of birthing innovation centers outside the Yabacon catchment area, instead expanding the ecosystem at its frontiers. It has centers in Ikeja near computer village, in Abuja in the Jabi commercial area and Ibadan in the UI-Poly axis in Mokola area.

Wennovation Hub was initially founded as a co-initiative of Africa Leadership Forum and LoftyInc Allied Partners. In 2014, it was spurn off into its own independent legal entity, Wennovation Hub Gte Ltd. In 2015, Wennovation Hub became one of the first Hubs to open its doors in Ibadan, again in partnership with Africa Leadership Forum. Wennovation Hub leverages several models in its multi-center structure including the Kick Accelerator model and the Village Capital model.

Wennovation Hub runs several business plan competitions, hackathons and also supports start-ups with direct investments. It was recognized by Tech Point as one of 5 accelerators in Nigeria, start-ups can take their big ideas to in 2015. Wennovation Hub was awarded the 2015 Ashoka: Innovators for the Public Global Changemakers Award by the Ashoka Foundation.

The founders of Wennovation Hub are Wole Odetayo, Michael Oluwagbemi, Idris Bello and Dami Agboola.

References

Innovation organizations
Business incubators of Nigeria
Companies based in Lagos